Beate Salen is a German Paralympic skier. She represented Germany in para-alpine skiing at the 1994 Paralympic Winter Games in Norway. She won a total of three medals, including one silver medal, and two bronze medals.

Career 
At the 1994 Winter Paralympics, in Lillehammer, Salen finished 2nd in the super-G LW2 with a time of 1:18.88. In 1st place was Sarah Billmeier in 1: 18.36, and in 3rd place was Adrienne Rivera in 1:19.34. 

Salen won two bronze medals: in the slalom LW2 in 1:33.91 (with gold for the Austrian athlete Helga Erhart in 1:31.15, and silver for the American Sarah Billmeier in 1:33.22), and downhill LW2 in 1:22.60 (1st place Sarah Billmeier with a time of 1:17.77 and 2nd place Helga Erhart with 1:20.60).

References 

Living people
Paralympic alpine skiers of Germany
German female alpine skiers
Alpine skiers at the 1994 Winter Paralympics
Medalists at the 1994 Winter Paralympics
Paralympic silver medalists for Germany
Paralympic bronze medalists for Germany
Date of birth missing (living people)